Echo, in comics, may refer to:

Echo (Marvel Comics)
Echo (DC Comics)
Query and Echo, the team of henchmen for the Riddler that featured the fifth character in DC Comics named "Echo"
Echo (comic book), an independently published comic series by Terry Moore

See also
Echo (disambiguation)